Heylaertsia quadripuncta is a moth of the family Psychidae first described by George Hampson in 1897. It is found in Sri Lanka.

References

Moths of Asia
Moths described in 1892
Psychidae